Raglan Barracks is a military installation at Barrack Hill in Allt-yr-yn in Newport, Wales.

History
The barracks were built as a cavalry barracks and completed in 1845. During the First World War they were known as the Cavalry Barracks and served as the 4th cavalry depot providing accommodation for the 2nd Dragoon Guards (Queen's Bays), the 3rd Dragoon Guards, the 4th Royal Irish Dragoon Guards, the Carabiniers (6th Dragoon Guards), the 7th Dragoon Guards and the 6th (Inniskilling) Dragoons. The barracks were renamed Raglan Barracks after FitzRoy Somerset, 1st Baron Raglan in 1963.

Units
The barracks are now home to: 
 Headquarters, 104th Regiment Royal Artillery, 
 Corps of Drums of 3rd Battalion, Royal Welsh.
 Detachment, 4th Battalion the Parachute Regiment
 E Squadron 21 SAS (MAB 4), 
 711 MI Section, 7 Military Intelligence Battalion 
 Band of the Royal Welsh

References

Barracks in Wales
Installations of the British Army